Monstera membranacea is a species of flowering plant in the genus Monstera of the arum family, Araceae.

Description 

The lamina is very thin and membranaceous, the spathe runs down the flower stalk for 3 – 8 cm. The fruit is green with the style portion falling off to show the seeds within a bright orange pulp. The seeds are spherical, with the S-shaped ridge forming a bump on the surface. The juvenile growth of M. membranacea is similar M. siltepecana, but features of the adults separate the species.

Distribution 
it is native to Costa Rica and west Panama.

References 

membranacea